In photobiology, the einstein (symbol E) is defined as one mole of photons. As such, photosynthetically active radiation (PAR) may be reported in microeinsteins per second per square meter (μE⋅m−2⋅s−1). The einstein is not part of the International System of Units (SI) and is redundant with the mole.

Since the unit does not have a standard definition and is not part of the SI system, it is usually better to avoid its use. The same information about photosynthetically active radiation can be conveyed using the SI convention by stating something such as "The photon flux was 1500 μmol⋅m−2⋅s−1".

The einstein may have been originally defined as the energy in one mole of photons. Since the energy of a photon is proportional to its frequency, this definition would make this ill-defined as a unit of energy.

This unit was named after physicist Albert Einstein.

References 

Photochemistry
Units of amount of substance